This is a list of the lists of encyclicals which have been promulgated by Popes of the Catholic Church.
 List of encyclicals of Pope Benedict XIV
 List of encyclicals of Pope Pius VI
 List of encyclicals of Pope Pius VII
 List of encyclicals of Pope Leo XII
 List of encyclicals of Pope Pius VIII
 List of encyclicals of Pope Gregory XVI
 List of encyclicals of Pope Pius IX
 List of encyclicals of Pope Leo XIII
 List of encyclicals of Pope Leo XIII on the Rosary
 List of encyclicals of Pope Pius X
 List of encyclicals of Pope Benedict XV
 List of encyclicals of Pope Pius XI
 List of encyclicals of Pope Pius XII
 List of encyclicals of Pope John XXIII
 List of encyclicals of Pope Paul VI
 List of encyclicals of Pope John Paul II
 List of encyclicals of Pope Benedict XVI
 List of encyclicals of Pope Francis